Tranøy Lighthouse is a coastal lighthouse in Hamarøy Municipality in Nordland county, Norway.

History
The lighthouse here was originally built in 1864 and in 1991 the light was automated. The lighthouse has a white, red, or green light (depending on direction) that is occulting three times every 10 seconds. The 27-metre (89 ft) round cast iron tower is painted red with one white horizontal band. The site includes a complete and well-preserved light station, including a -story duplex keeper's house, generator house, boathouse, and farm buildings.

The present lighthouse was built in 1914 as the Moholmen Lighthouse in Vågan Municipality, but it was relocated here in 1936 and Moholmen was replaced by a shorter tower. Beginning in 1993, the Tranøy lighthouse station has been developed as a tourist attraction. The site has views across the Vestfjorden to the high mountains of the Lofoten islands. Tranøy Lighthouse is accessible by road, with a footbridge that leads to the lighthouse.

See also

Lighthouses in Norway
List of lighthouses in Norway

References

External links
 Norsk Fyrhistorisk Forening 
 

Lighthouses completed in 1864
Lighthouses completed in 1914
Hamarøy
Lighthouses in Nordland
Listed lighthouses in Norway